Our Season is an upcoming South Korean film directed by Yook Sang-hyo, starring Kim Hae-sook, Shin Min-a, Kang Ki-young, and Hwang Bo-ra. It is a fantasy drama film about a miraculous moment that happens when a mother comes down from the sky on a three-day vacation and stays with her daughter.

Cast 
 Kim Hae-sook as Park Bok-ja
 Shin Min-a as Bang Jin-joo
 Kang Ki-young as guide who guides the Blessed One to another world
 Hwang Bo-ra as Mi-jin, Jin-joo's old friend
 Park Myung-hoon
 Kim Min-Kyung

Production 
Filming began in January 2020 and ended in March 2020.

References

External links
 
 
 

Upcoming films
2020s Korean-language films
Showbox films
South Korean fantasy films
South Korean drama films
Films about vacationing